This is a list of films produced by the Bollywood film industry based in Mumbai in 1955:

Highest-grossing films
The eleven highest-grossing films at the Indian Box Office in 1955 were:

A-C

D-J

K-Q

R-Z

References

External links
 Bollywood films of 1955 at the Internet Movie Database
 Indian Film Songs from the Year 1955 - A look back at 1955 with a special focus on Hindi film songs
Listen to songs from Bollywood films of 1955

1955
Bollywood
Films, Bollywood